Madesha is a 2008  Indian Kannada-language action-thriller film starring Shiva Rajkumar and Sonu Bhatia. It was directed by Ravi Srivathsa and produced by B. M. Govardhan Murthy. The movie released in August. Audio was launched on 24 Jun 2008.

Cast 

Shiva Rajkumar as Madesha
Sonu Bhatia
Ravi Belagere	
Ravi Kale as Ashok Kumar
Ramesh Pandit		
Muniraj	
Bullet Prakash	
Kote Prabhakar
Raghu	
Harish Rai	
Arun Sagar		
Padmaja Rao
M. N. Lakshmi Devi	
Vijayasarathi	
Mallesh	
Dattatreya	
Ashwath Narayana
Sathish Ninasam
Jyothi Rana - Item number

Soundtrack

The music was composed by Mano Murthy and released by T-Series.

Reception

Critical response 

R G Vijayasarathy of Rediff.com scored the film at 3 out of 5 stars and says "Mano Murthy has composed music for an action film for the first time. His songs have variety, but they are not exceptional. The background score by Sadhu Kokila is good. Maadesha is an enjoyable film for Shivraj Kumar fans". A critic from Bangalore Mirror wrote "But the rest of the film is a glorified killing field. In one particular scene the state home minister writes a cheque for Rs 50 lakh to an underworld don to take on a rival. This shows the director’s lack of knowledge beyond guns and machetes". A critic from Sify.com wrote "G.S.V.Seetharam the silent and sensible cameraman of Kannada cinema gives a splendid work. The top angles shots in Australia for the song is brilliant. Action lovers and die hard Shivrajkumar will love it".

References

External links

Official site

2000s Kannada-language films
2008 films
Films scored by Mano Murthy